Down Thomas is a village in Devon, England. The village is situated about 4 miles south of Plymouth. It is on the Wembury peninsula and is surrounded by farmland. The village is a part of the South Hams local government district.

The village has a pub, post office, bike shop and a local village store.

The population is 230. The village is mentioned in the Domesday Book.

Manor Farm was the owning building of the area. It burnt down in 1800 and the salvaged wood was used to build the new house on the same site.

References

External links

Villages in South Hams